Étoile Sportive Ben Aknoun, known as ES Ben Aknoun  or simply ESBA for short, is an Algerian football club based in Hai Ouled Smail in Ben Aknoun. The club was founded in 1935 and its colours are Red black and white. Their home stadium, El Mokrani Staduim, has a capacity of 5,000 spectators. The club is currently playing in the Algerian Ligue 2.

On August 5, 2020, ES Ben Aknoun promoted to the Algerian Ligue 2.

References

External links 

Algerian Ligue 2 clubs
Association football clubs established in 1935